Drewryville is an unincorporated community in western Southampton County, Virginia, United States, off U.S. Route 58. It lies at an elevation of 98 feet (30 m).

The Aspen Lawn was listed on the National Register of Historic Places in 2002.

References

Unincorporated communities in Southampton County, Virginia
Unincorporated communities in Virginia